Bestseller is a 2010 South Korean mystery thriller film written and directed by Lee Jeong-ho.

Plot
Baek Hee-soo has been a bestselling author for the past 20 years. But her reputation gets destroyed overnight when she is accused of plagiarizing a competition entry she'd previously judged. Battling depression and writer's block in the two years since, Hee-soo accepts the suggestion of her longtime publisher friend to stay at a remote country home in a small, rural town with her daughter Yeon-hee, where she'll be able to write in peace. Then Yeon-hee tells her mother that a mysterious, invisible woman in the house has been telling her stories, and Hee-soo turns those fascinating stories into a new book. It becomes an instant bestseller, but Hee-soo's regained fame doesn't last long as she becomes embroiled in another plagiarism scandal, with rumors swirling that the contents of her book are from a novel that had been published 10 years ago. To prove her innocence, Hee-soo sets out to uncover the truth and find who her daughter was talking to.

Cast
Uhm Jung-hwa as Baek Hee-soo
Ryu Seung-ryong as Park Young-joon
Lee Do-kyeong as Manager/Chan-sik's father
Cho Jin-woong as Chan-sik
Lee Sung-min as Editor 
Kim Hwa-young as Director Song
Park Sa-rang as Yeon-hee 
Choi Mu-seong as Middle-aged man 1 
Jo Hee-bong as Middle-aged man 2 
Oh Jung-se as Middle-aged man 3 
Yeo Moo-young as Doctor 
Kim Hong-pa as Resident 1 
Go In-beom as Resident 2 
Kim Choon-gi as Resident 3 
Seo Yi-sook as Author's daughter
Lee Da-eun as Choi Soo-jin 
Lee Yeon as young Chan-sik 
Ha Dae-ro as young Man 1
Kim Dae-young as young Man 3
Lee Yong-nyeo as Talk show host 
Choi Kang-hee as Whispers (voice cameo)

Awards
 2010 The 14th Bucheon International Fantastic Film Festival
European Fantastic Film Festival Alliance 
Asian Film Awards- Lee Jung - ho
 2010 The 18th Chunsa Film Art Awards
 Best Actress - Uhm Jung-hwa
 Best New Actor - Cho Jin-woong
 Best Art Direction - Yang Hok-sam, Jang Seok-jin

References

External links
 

2010 films
2010s mystery thriller films
2010s horror thriller films
South Korean mystery thriller films
South Korean horror films
2010 horror films
2010s South Korean films
Showbox films